The SIAP (Single Integrated Air Picture) is the "Air" component of the Common Tactical Picture.  It will allow U.S. military service personnel and allies to share a single graphical representation of the battlespace.  This will be accomplished using data generated by multiple land, surface and air sensors and broadcast via a sophisticated logistical information distribution system.  Once designed, the SIAP and will help users make better, more informed decisions by linking military forces and their tactical situations.

Single Integrated Air Picture (SIAP) is the product of fused, common, continuous, unambiguous tracks of all airborne objects in the surveillance area. Each object within the SIAP has one, and only one, track number and set of associated characteristics. The SIAP is developed from near-real time and real time data, and is scalable and filterable to support situation awareness, battle management, and target engagements.

Surveillance